Ľubomír Vaškovič (born April 2, 1986) is a Slovak professional ice hockey left winger for SHK Hodonín of the Czech 2.liga.

Vaškovič previously played 48 games in the Czech Extraliga for HC Znojemští Orli between 2005 and 2007. He also played 117 games in the Slovak Extraliga for HK 32 Liptovský Mikuláš, HK Dukla Trenčín and HK 36 Skalica and ten games in the Elite Ice Hockey League for the Dundee Stars.

References

External links

1986 births
Living people
HC Dukla Jihlava players
HK Dukla Trenčín players
Dundee Stars players
SHK Hodonín players
LHK Jestřábi Prostějov players
HC Kometa Brno players
MHk 32 Liptovský Mikuláš players
HC Olomouc players
Orli Znojmo players
People from Myjava
Sportspeople from the Trenčín Region
HK 91 Senica players
HK 36 Skalica players
Slovak ice hockey left wingers
1. EV Weiden players
Slovak expatriate sportspeople in Scotland
Slovak expatriate ice hockey players in the Czech Republic
Slovak expatriate ice hockey players in Germany
Expatriate ice hockey players in Scotland